John Schneider (born May 25, 1971) is a professional American football executive, currently serving as the General Manager and Executive Vice President for the Seattle Seahawks of the National Football League (NFL). Schneider was previously an executive for the Washington Redskins and Green Bay Packers in the 2000s. He was a primary architect in building the Seahawks roster that went on to win Super Bowl XLVIII.

Early years
Schneider grew up in Wisconsin and attended high school in De Pere at Abbot Pennings High School, where he played football and graduated in 1989. He studied history and secondary education at University of St. Thomas and was on the football team his Freshman year until injuries caused him to retire. During his Junior year he wrote a letter to Ron Wolf asking if he could work as a scout. His internship that summer was the beginning of his relationship with the Green Bay Packers.

Professional executive career

Green Bay Packers
He started working in the Scouting Department for the Green Bay Packers in 1993.

Kansas City Chiefs
He was the Director of Pro Personnel for the Chiefs from 1997 to 2000.

Seattle Seahawks
He worked for the Seahawks in 2000 under Ted Thompson as Director of Player Personnel.

Washington Redskins
In 2001, Schneider became the Vice President of Player Personnel.

Green Bay Packers
Schneider went back to the Green Bay Packers as the top personnel aide to the Packers' GM. He then elevated to Director of Football Operations.

Seattle Seahawks
On January 11, 2010, the Seahawks announced the hiring of Pete Carroll as Head Coach and Vice President of Football Operations. One week later, on January 18, 2010, the Seahawks announced the hiring of John Schneider as their General Manager. Schneider added the distinction of Executive Vice President in 2013. In his role, he manages all aspects of the Seahawks roster and draft process while working collaboratively with Pete Carroll in all facets of the football operations department.  

Since arriving, Schneider and Carroll have orchestrated a complete overhaul of Seattle's roster. In 2010, Schneider completed 284 roster transactions, including trading for Marshawn Lynch. On February 2, 2014, the Seahawks won Super Bowl XLVIII, their first and only championship in their existence. Of those on the championship roster, only Max Unger, Red Bryant, Jon Ryan and Brandon Mebane were Seahawks prior to Schneider's arrival in Seattle. Schneider and Seattle followed their Super Bowl win with another NFC Championship, but lost to New England in Super Bowl XLIX. In 2015, the Seahawks clinched a wild card berth, but fell in the NFC Divisional Round to the Panthers. Schneider signed a 5-year contract extension with the Seahawks in July 2016 that keeps him in Seattle through the 2021 season. The Seahawks won their fourth NFC West title under Schneider in 2016, but were eliminated in the divisional round of the playoffs for the second straight year. In 2021, Schneider signed a 6-year contract extension with the Seahawks that will keep him in Seattle through the 2027 draft. 

Schneider has been praised for his late-round draft picks and undrafted free agent signings. With Seattle, he drafted Russell Wilson, Richard Sherman, Kam Chancellor, Byron Maxwell, Tyler Lockett, K.J. Wright, Chris Carson, Abraham Lucas, and Tariq Woolen in the third round or later, and signed Doug Baldwin, Thomas Rawls, DeShawn Shead, Poona Ford and Jermaine Kearse after they went undrafted. The Seahawks have been active in free agency and the trade market under Schneider as well, signing key free agents Michael Bennett, Cliff Avril, and Uchenna Nwosu, and trading for Marshawn Lynch, Jimmy Graham, Duane Brown, Quandre Diggs and Jamal Adams.

Awards and honors
Super Bowl XLVIII Champion (as EVP/GM of the Seattle Seahawks)

Personal life
John Schneider has a wife, Traci, and two sons, Ben and Jack. Schneider and wife Traci founded Ben's Fund in 2012 in honor of their son, Ben, who was diagnosed with autism at the age of 3. The intent of Ben’s Fund is to provide financial support to children and young adults with autism in Washington State along with guidance and support as they continue their journey.

References

External links
 Seattle Seahawks profile

1971 births
Living people
American people of German descent
Green Bay Packers executives
Green Bay Packers scouts
Seattle Seahawks executives
Washington Redskins executives
National Football League general managers
Players of American football from Wisconsin
St. Thomas (Minnesota) Tommies football players